Cylindromorphus is a genus of beetles in the family Buprestidae, containing the following species:

 Cylindromorphus acus Abeille de Perrin, 1897
 Cylindromorphus araxidis Reitter, 1889
 Cylindromorphus bifrons Rey, 1889
 Cylindromorphus bohemicus Obenberger, 1933
 Cylindromorphus caspicus Obenberger, 1934
 Cylindromorphus cribratus Abeille de Perrin, 1897
 Cylindromorphus dalmatinus Csiki, 1915
 Cylindromorphus filum (Gyllenhal, 1817)
 Cylindromorphus gallicus Mulsant & Rey, 1863
 Cylindromorphus opacus Abeille de Perrin, 1897
 Cylindromorphus parallelus Fairmaire, 1859
 Cylindromorphus platiai Curletti, 1981
 Cylindromorphus popovi (Mannerheim, 1853)
 Cylindromorphus pubescens Semenov, 1895
 Cylindromorphus pyrethri Stierlin, 1863
 Cylindromorphus strictipennis Reitter, 1895
 Cylindromorphus talyshensis Kalashian, 1998
 Cylindromorphus turkestanicus Abeille de Perrin, 1904
 Cylindromorphus vedicus Kalashian, 2002

References

Buprestidae genera